The Land, Public Works and Transport Bureau (DSSOPT;) is a department under the Secretariat for Transport and Public Works of Macau, China.

It is responsible for government policy and regulation over transport, land use, and public works and infrastructure in Macau.

Departments
 Urbanization 
 Licensing Division
 Inspection Division
 Urban Planning
 Public Construction
 Project and Construction Works
 Maintenance and Repair Division
 Land Management 
 Infrastructure 
 Hydraulics and Sanitation Division
 Geotechnics and Roads Division

See also
 Government of Macau

References

 Decreto-Lei n.º 29/97/M de 7 de Julho via Imprensa Oficial

External links
 Official website

Government departments and agencies of Macau
1990 establishments in Macau